The 2004 Oklahoma Democratic presidential primary, part of the process of selecting that party's nominee for President of the United States, took place on February 3, one of the seven nominating contests of 2004's "Mini-Tuesday".  The primary election chose 40 pledged delegates to represent Oklahoma at the 2004 Democratic National Convention. The remainder of Oklahoma's 47 delegates consisted of unpledged superdelegates not bound by the results of the primary. The election was a closed primary, meaning that only registered Democrats could vote in this election. Wesley Clark won the primary by a razor-thin margin over John Edwards.

Candidates
 General Wesley Clark of Arkansas
 Former Governor Howard Dean of Vermont
 Senator John Edwards of North Carolina
 Senator John Kerry of Massachusetts
 Representative Dennis Kucinich of Ohio
 Senator Joe Lieberman of Connecticut, 2000 Democratic Party vice-presidential candidate
 Reverend Al Sharpton of New York

Withdrawn
 Representative Dick Gephardt of Missouri, former House Minority Leader
 Former Senator and Ambassador Carol Moseley-Braun of Illinois

Results

See also
 2004 Oklahoma Republican presidential primary

References

Oklahoma
Democratic presidential primary
2004